Anikó Ungár (born 11 January 1949) is a Hungarian magician. She lives in Buda with her husband who is a banker.

References

1949 births
Living people
Hungarian magicians
Entertainers from Budapest